Zhang Yuming (Chinese: 張羽明), courtesy name Shengqu, was a Chinese official of the Qing Dynasty.

Zhang Yuming passed the second stage of the imperial exams and received his Juren degree. In 1665, he was appointed as the Prefect of Songjiang Prefecture. The short-lived "Academy of Purity and Harmony" (Qīng-Hé Shūyuàn) in Shanghai's Yu Garden was initially dedicated to him.

References

Qing dynasty politicians from Liaoning
Politicians from Huludao